Vargem Grande Paulista is a municipality in the state of São Paulo in Brazil. It is part of the Metropolitan Region of São Paulo. The population is 53,468 (2020 est.) in an area of 42.49 km².

References

Municipalities in São Paulo (state)